Musicians at the Edinburgh International Festival, 1957–1966 lists the major artists who appeared during the second decade of the Edinburgh International Festival.

Orchestras and groups from Scotland, Britain, Austria, France, Germany, Switzerland, Denmark, the Netherlands, Czechoslovakia, Poland, the Soviet Union, Canada and the USA were all invited to perform.

The Scottish Orchestra, now known as the Royal Scottish National Orchestra, and BBC Scottish Orchestra were present, joined by the London Symphony Orchestra, Royal Philharmonic Orchestra, Philharmonia Orchestra, Royal Opera House Orchestra, Covent Garden, Royal Liverpool Philharmonic Orchestra; Hallé Orchestra, Bournemouth Symphony Orchestra, BBC Concert Orchestra, English Chamber Orchestra and others.

European and American orchestras included the Berlin Philharmonic, Bavarian Radio Symphony Orchestra, Hamburg Radio Symphony Orchestra, Czech Philharmonic,  Orchestra of the National Theatre, Prague, Concertgebouw Orchestra, Netherlands Chamber Orchestra, Vienna Symphony Orchestra, Orchestre National de la RTF, Royal Danish Orchestra, Polish Radio Symphony Orchestra, Lucerne Festival Strings, Leningrad Symphony Orchestra, Moscow Radio Orchestra, the Pittsburgh Symphony Orchestra and the National Youth Orchestra of Canada.

Each orchestra or group came with celebrated conductors and soloists, many of whom are still famous today as their recordings remain the standard by which contemporary musicians are judged.

1957

1958

1959

1960

1961

1962

1963

1964

1965

1966

References

See also
Edinburgh International Festival
World premieres at the Edinburgh International Festival
Musicians at the Edinburgh International Festival, 1947 to 1956
Opera at the Edinburgh International Festival: history and repertoire, 1947–1956
Opera at the Edinburgh International Festival: history and repertoire, 1957–1966
Opera at the Edinburgh International Festival: history and repertoire, 1967–1976
Ballet at the Edinburgh International Festival: history and repertoire, 1947–1956
Ballet at the Edinburgh International Festival: history and repertoire, 1957–1966
Ballet at the Edinburgh International Festival: history and repertoire, 1967–1976
Drama at the Edinburgh International Festival: history and repertoire, 1947–1956
Drama at the Edinburgh International Festival: history and repertoire, 1957–1966
Visual Arts at the Edinburgh International Festival, 1947–1976

Edinburgh Festival
Music-related lists
Classical music festivals in Scotland
Annual events in Edinburgh
1957 music festivals
1958 music festivals
1959 music festivals
1960 music festivals
1961 music festivals
1962 music festivals
1963 music festivals
1964 music festivals
1965 music festivals
1966 music festivals